The Sound of Happiness is a Taiwanese Hokkien television drama that began airing on SET Taiwan in Taiwan on 26 December 2018, from Mondays to Fridays, and ended its broadcast on 5 August 2020. The series started production on 22 November 2018. The series is aired every weeknight at 8pm and is simulcast one hour later on SET Taiwan's sister channel, SET Drama.

Synopsis
Wu is a senior police officer has always wanted a son to carry his family name and join the force. However, he and wife are bequeathed with four daughters! As a doting father, his chief objective is to help them find happiness in their marriages. In this charming drama, Wu & his wife become their daughters’ greatest haven, through the ups and downs they face as married women.

Cast
Norman Chen as Lin Zhi Ming and Liu Tian Ding
Athena Lee Yen as Wu Jia Yun
John Chen as Zhang Zheng Hao and Hu Li Hai 
Shuwei Zhang as Mo Hao Tian 
Cocco Wu as Wu Jia Wen (Coco)
Margaret Wang as Wang Yan Xi
James Chen as Lin Zhi Wen
Vivi Chen as Cai Yun Ru
Nic Chiang as Jiang Hong Jie 
Michell Lin as Ren Yu Tang
Liu Hsiao-Yi as Ye Li Mei
Eric Huang as Zhao Tian Yu
Johny Liu as Li Jian Hua 
 as He Xin Di
Grace Lin as Wu Jia Xiu
Lance Yu as Zhan Wei Kai/David
Richard Shen as Fan Zhu Sheng/Robert
Star Lin as Li Rong Guang
Bella Zhang as Ni Xiao Xin
Miao Zhen as Huang Li Lin
Zhang Qin as Yang Ah Mei
Huang Jian Qun as Lin Qing Long
Michelle Ho as Yao Ming Zhu
Lin Zai Pei as Wu Guo Hui
Liu Mei Ling as Ceng Mei Ru
Sunny Li as Wu Jia Xuan
Josh Wu as Wu Jia Long
Peilin Tsai as Ceng Huan Huan
Hsieh Chiung-hsuan as Xie Bao Xiu
Huang Yu Rong as Jin Yong Jian
Ruby Lin as Lin Shan Shan
Wang Man Jiao as Ah Shui Po
He Guan Ying as Cai Fu Gui
Su Yi Qing as Chen Yue Xia
Chen Ting as Zhan Kun Mao
Li Rui Shen as Yin Jun Nan
Elissa Liao as Li Bao Na
Zhu Yong De as Wang Shi Chang
Liu Hsiu-wen as Chen Yu Yan
Xu Jun Jun as Fang Mei Yun/Luo Anna
Hsu Heng as Xu Ming Qiang
Mong Ning as Lin Xiao Ke 
Rex Wu as Cai Chong Ren
Franco Chiang as Zhou Rui Yuan
Kelly Ko as Shen Xiu Chun
Mai Hai Lin as Zhou Jia Mai
Ling-shan Wu as Zhou Yong Cheng
Kiki Lin as Zhou Yong Qi
Lara Chen as Xu Pei Qi/Nai Cha
Josie Leung as Shen Fang Zi
Danny Chen as Ceng Guo Hao/Ryan
On Xue Bin as Luo Guan Ting
Lee Chia-Yi as Luo Hui Lin
Wu Yi Han as Zhao Dora
Huang Chong Lan as Chen Dong/Chen Li Min
Kai Hsu as Andrew
Lin Yi Fang as Chen Tian En
Junior Han as Chen Jian Hong
Ho Yi Pei as Chen Wei Xin/Chloe
Vins Zheng as Jiang Can Tang/K-Dong
Yuki Hsu as Jiang Yong Qi/Angela
Lin Pei Jun as Fang Bi Lian
Gao Shan Feng as Qian Jin
Elsie Yeh as Lin Luo Shi/Rose
Li Xin as Fang Xin Yu
Akio Chen as Liu Ah Yi
Patrick Lee as Liu Da Wei
Ding Ning as Zhang Hui Xin
Joyce Yu as Ceng Kai Xin
Ah Loong as Gu Wen Yan
Cheng Peng Gao as Ye Qing Gong
Carolyn Chen as Jia Man Yi/Maggie
Li Fang Wen as Du Ba La
Chen Bo Han as Ah V
Pan Li Li as Ye Qiu Kou
Ricie Fun as Xia Ying Ying
Yuan Li Shan as LiShan
Troy Chu as Kai Wen
Blair Chu as Zheng Ting
Chen Di Yuan as Zhang Di Yuan
James Cheng as Jiang Cheng En
Hsieh Chi-Wen as Li Guan Jun
Mei Fang as Wang Li Hong
Hong Rui Xia as He Su Jiu
He Jie Rou as Xu An An
Zhan Jia Lin as Zhao Chye
Li Bo Xiang as Jia Bao Yu/Steven
Lai Ping Xuan as Dian Dian
Leo Ding as Ding Shi Min
Jimmy Chen as Tony

International broadcast

Malaysia
The drama aired on Astro Hua Hee Dai in the 9:30pm timeslot every weeknight, running from January 10, 2019 and ending on August 14, 2020. On 8TV, the show is currently airing since March 16, 2020 in the 3:30-5:30pm timeslot, showing 2 one-hour format episodes every weeknight.

Vietnam
The show in currently airing on Echannel under the name "Tiếng Pháo Vu Quy" every night in the 6:00-8:00pm timeslot (two episodes a day) since August 28, 2019. This makes Vietnam the first country to air the show under a 60-minute format. But now, Echannel only air 1 episode/day.

Singapore
The show airs 7pm to 9:15pm every weeknight on Jia Le Channel since September 23, 2019.

References

External links
The Sound of Happiness Website \

Sanlih E-Television original programming
Taiwanese drama television series
2018 Taiwanese television series debuts
Hokkien-language television shows